Plénée-Jugon (Gallo: Plénét) is a commune in the Côtes-d'Armor department of Brittany in northwestern France.

The Arguenon river flows through the commune.

Population

Inhabitants of Plénée-Jugon are called plénéens in French.

See also
Communes of the Côtes-d'Armor department

References

External links

Communes of Côtes-d'Armor